Old Warden Tunnel nature reserve is a  nature reserve near Old Warden in Bedfordshire. It is managed by the Wildlife Trust for Bedfordshire, Cambridgeshire and Northamptonshire. The site is on top of a disused railway tunnel, Old Warden Tunnel.

The site has oak and ash woodland with mature blackthorn and hawthorn bushes, and a steep cutting with grassland and scrub. Flowers include dwarf thistle and pyramidal orchid, and the scrub provides nesting sites for birds.

There is access by a track from Southill Road.

References 

https://link.medium.com/lA6o8F7o4ab

Wildlife Trust for Bedfordshire, Cambridgeshire and Northamptonshire reserves